Joseph Oliach Eciru is a Catholic bishop, who is the Bishop of Soroti, since 25 May 2019.

Early life and education
Eciru was born 11 August 1970 at Ookai Village, Dokolo Parish, Gweri sub-county in Soroti District. His deceased parents are John Francis Oliac and Ann Maria Aguti.

He attended Gweri Primary School and St. Aloysius Demonstration Primary School in Ngora. He studied at St. Peter's Seminary Madera, in the city of Soroti for his O-Level studies. He then completed his A-Level education at St. Pius X Seminary in Nagongera, Tororo District.

He was ordained a priest on 9 August 2003, at St. Patrick's Catholic Parish, Madera by Bishop Erasmus Desiderius Wandera. Eciru later obtained a Licentiate in Sacred Scripture at the Pontifical Biblical Institute (Biblicum), in Rome. This was followed by a Doctorate in Biblical Theology from Pontifical Urbaniana University, also in Rome.

Priesthood
Father Eciru served as a lecturer of Latin at St. Peter's Seminary Madera, before he lectured Sacred Scripture at St. Paul's National Seminary Kinyamasika, in Fort Portal, in the Western Region of Uganda. At the time of his appointment as Bishop of Soroti Diocese he was serving as Lecturer of Sacred Scripture at St. Mary's National Seminary in Ggaba, Kampala.

Pope Francis appointed him bishop on 19 March 2019. He was consecrated bishop at Soroti on 25 May 2019, by Archbishop Emmanuel Obbo, of Tororo, assisted by Archbishop Luigi Bianco,
Titular Archbishop of Falerone and Bishop Francis Aquirinus Kibira, Bishop of Kasese.

See also
 Roman Catholicism in Uganda

References

External links

Pope appoints Bishop for Soroti Diocese As of 20 March 2019.

1970 births
Living people
People from Soroti District
21st-century Roman Catholic bishops in Uganda
People from Eastern Region, Uganda
Roman Catholic bishops of Soroti